The Moore family was a prominent political family of North and South Carolina during the 18th and 19th centuries.  They are believed to be related to or descended from Rory O'More, Lord of Laois, a leader of the Irish Rebellion of 1641.  The family is most closely associated with the Cape Fear coastal region around Wilmington.  Several members of the family held prominent political positions in colonial North and South Carolina, were officers in the Continental Army during the American Revolutionary War, or held high positions in the United States federal government during the early years of the republic. They are cousins with Rory O'More's sole male descendants and current holders of the title of Lord of Laois, the More O'Ferralls.

Governor James Moore 

Governor James Moore was the patriarch of the family.  He served as the governor of the Province of Carolina from 1700-1703.  He had two prominent sons, James and Maurice.

James Moore II 

James Moore II was a colonel in the colonial militia who served in the Yamassee War and would be a governor of the Province of South Carolina after North and South Carolina split. He served in that position 1719-1721.

Maurice Moore 

Maurice had been a speaker of the North Carolina legislature.  As speaker the Maurice Moore had championed settlement of the Cape Fear region under Governor George Burrington and led frequent conflicts with Burrington's successor, Richard Everard.  Maurice had two sons, named James and Maurice.

Maurice Moore II 

Maurice Moore II had been appointed as a Judge, but when the younger Maurice became a vocal opponent of the Stamp Act, he was removed from the bench by Governor William Tryon.  Both he and his brother James served in the colonial legislature.  He had at least one son, Alfred.

General James Moore 

General James Moore served in the Continental Army, first as a colonel, and later, after he distinguished himself leading the troops at the Battle of Moore's Creek Bridge, as a Brigadier General and commander of the Southern Department, a position he would only hold for a few months before his sudden death in April, 1777.

Alfred Moore 

Alfred Moore would serve as an officer in the Continental Army, and later as an Associate Justice of the United States Supreme Court.

Other people related to the Moore family 

General Robert Howe was a Major General in the Continental Army and was a great-grandson of Governor James Moore.

American families of Irish ancestry
O'Moore family